Civil Law Commentaries is an open access publication of the Eason-Weinmann Center for Comparative Law at the Tulane University Law School. It is published online annually and is a student-edited publication dedicated to the study of the Louisiana Civil Code and the state's long civilian tradition.

Civil Law Commentaries publishes articles by law professors, judges, attorneys, and students on private law and comparative law topics, favoring those related to Louisiana law and legal history. The journal also publishes book reviews, notes, comments, and English translations of legal works.

Advisors and editors 
 A. N. Yiannopoulos, Editor Emeritus
 Brandon Thibodeaux, editor in chief, 2008–09
 Francisco A. Besosa-Martinez, editor in chief, 2009–10

External links 
 

American law journals
Tulane University Law School
Louisiana law
Publications established in 2008
Annual journals
English-language journals